Patrick Quinn was appointed  Vicar Apostolic to administer the See of Clogher by Pope Gregory XV on 30 July 1622.

See also
Roman Catholic Diocese of Clogher

References

17th-century Irish Roman Catholic priests
Apostolic vicars